The Chrysopeleiinae are a subfamily of the Cosmopterigidae, although some authors treat it as a full family, the Chrysopeleiidae.

Distribution
The subfamily is distributed mostly in Central Asia, southern Asia, Africa and in America. In the Palearctic realm, over 50 species are found, with 16 species in six genera found in Europe.

Genera
Afeda (Nearctic)
Ascalenia (Palearctic, African, Australia)
Bifascia
Bifascioides
Calanesia (from Tunisia)
Calycobathra (northern Africa, Near & Middle East)
Chrysopeleia (nearctic)
Gisilia (Palearctic & African)
Ithome (Nearctic & Neotropical)
Nepotula (Nearctic)
Obithome (Nearctic)
Perimede (Nearctic & Neotropical)
Periploca (Nearctic & Palearctic)
Pristen (Nearctic)
Siskiwitia
Sorhagenia (Palearctic & Nearctic)
Stilbosis (most species but 2 from the Americas)
Walshia (Nearctic & Neotropical)

Placement uncertain
The following genera are alternatively placed in the subfamily Cosmopteriginae:
Leptozestis
Orthromicta
Synploca
Trachydora

Formerly placed here
Eumenodora  (India/Australia)

References

 
Cosmopterigidae
Moth subfamilies